Roger Windle Pilkington (7 January 1915 – 5 May 2003) was a British writer and biologist. He is best-known for his 20-volume Small Boat series, recounting trips along Europe's inland waterways in an Admiral's Barge, which he had converted into a sea going cabin cruiser, named "Commodore". In 1992 he wrote about his crossing the Atlantic in the airship Hindenburg.

Early life and education
Pilkington was the third son of Richard Austin Pilkington (1871-1951), JP, of Eccleston Grange, St Helens, a director of the family glass-manufacturing business, Pilkington Brothers Ltd, and his wife, Hope (1876-1947), daughter of the politician and judge Herbert Cozens-Hardy, 1st Baron Cozens-Hardy. His elder brother was the glass manufacturer and life peer Harry Pilkington. The Pilkingtons were Congregationalist. Pilkington was educated at Magdalene College, Cambridge (BA 1937, MA 1941, PhD- in genetics- 1947).

Career
Pilkington produced 19 volumes in the Small Boat series, the first of his sailing books being Thames Waters, published in 1956, "an account of traveling the Thames in his cabin cruiser, a former admiral's barge called the Commodore"; his other works in this field included How Boats Are Navigated (1962), One Foot in France (1992), History and Legends of the European Waterways (1998). He also wrote about genetics and the relationship between sex and religion, these books including Males and Females (1948), Biology, Man and God (1951); How Your Life Began (1953); Revelation Through Science (1956); and World Without End (1960). He was also "author of a 1966 report by the British Council of Churches, Sex and Morality, criticized by some as overly tolerant of extramarital and premarital relations."

Personal life
In 1937, Pilkington married firstly Theodora Miriam Hewat-Jaboor, daughter of Dr Farris Nasser Jaboor, of The Red Gables, Wooler, Northumberland; they had two children, Cynthia Miriam (born 1939) and Hugh Austin Windle Pilkington (1942-1986). After their divorce, he married secondly, in 1973, Ingrid Maria, daughter of Herman Gustaf Geijer, of Brattfors, Sweden. She predeceased him by a year. Pilkington died in France, near Montouliers, he having spent many years of happy retirement between there and Jersey.

Bibliography

Small Boat series 

 Thames Waters (1956)
 Small Boat Through Belgium (1957)
 Small Boat Through Holland (1958)
 Small Boat to the Skagerrak (1960)
 Small Boat Through Sweden (1961)
 Small Boat to Alsace (1961)
 Small Boat to Bavaria (1962)
 Small Boat Through Germany (1963)
 Small Boat Through France (1964)
 Small Boat in Southern France (1965)
 Small Boat on the Thames (1966)
 Small Boat on the Meuse (1967)
 Small Boat to Luxembourg (1967)
 Small Boat on the Moselle (1968)
 Small Boat to Elsinore (1969)
 Small Boat to Northern Germany (1969)
 Small Boat on the Lower Rhine (1970)
 Small Boat on the Upper Rhine (1971)
 Small Boat down the Years (1987)
 Small Boat in the Midi (1989)

Other works 

 Males and Females (1948)
 Stringer's Folly (1951)
 Biology, Man and God (1951)
 How Your Life Began (1953)
 Revelation Through Science (1956)
 World Without End (1960)
 How Boats Are Navigated (1962)
 Sex and Morality (1966)
 Waterways in Europe (1971)
 The Ormering Tide (1974)
 One Foot in France (1992)
 View From the Shore (1995)
 History and Legends of the European Waterways (1998)

References 

1915 births
2003 deaths